Chorsu (and ), also called charsu, in Samarkand, Uzbekistan, is a domed, hexagonal shape building with central big dome and six small domes around central dome. Chorsu located at southeast of the Registan at the intersection of the roads connecting Samarkand, Tashkent, Bukhara, and Shahrisabz. Chorsu is a word of Persian origin meaning "crossroads," referring to this intersection.  The building is old,   It has a rather rich centuries-old history.  At the moment, it is included in the UNESCO World Heritage List along with the rest of the historical part of the city.

History 
Chorsu was originally a bazaar constructed in the 15th century but was rebuilt in the 18th century, becoming a hat market. Today, the bazaar which was previously housed at Chorsu is now the Siyob Bazaar near the Bibi-Khanym Mosque.

In 2005, ownership of Chorsu was transferred to the Academy of Arts of Uzbekistan. While renovating the building, three meters of dirt were removed from the building revealing the original base construction. Chorsu now serves as an art gallery which houses the work of artists both contemporary and historical. The art of in the Chorsu gallery displays the culture, history, and diversity of the Uzbek people.

See also
 Bazaars in Uzbekistan
 Siyob Bazaar (Samarkand)
 Chorsu Bazaar (Tashkent)

References

Buildings and structures in Samarkand
Retail markets in Uzbekistan
History of Samarkand